means "striking/attacking sword" and is one of the two roles in kata of budō and bujutsu; the other role is shidachi (受太刀).

The senior party is normally uchidachi.  In kata, the uchidachi takes the role of instructor and initiates the action and governing the tempo, although allowing the shidachi to strike the winning blow.  
This role  is like a nurturing parent (or teacher) who intentionally loses its skillful and true attack in order for its child (or disciple) to be able to develop. In no way is this of any competitive nature nor a way to test one's abilities. This role requires one to be humble and responsible because it embodies self-sacrifice of uchidachi in order to teach shidachi by offering guidance and education.

Any corrections in the distance between the two roles are made by uchidachi. Usually this role is fulfilled by the senior practitioner, hence this role is in the more difficult position of facing the sun when practising outside.

References

Japanese martial arts terminology